Chlorodihydrocodide is an opioid.

References
 

Opioids